KIAS may refer to:
 Korea Institute for Advanced Study
 Knots Indicated Airspeed

See also
 Kias or Qiasi, a village in Qarah Quyun-e Jonubi Rural District, Qarah Quyun District, Showt County, West Azerbaijan Province, Iran